Hemphill Brothers Coach Company is a motor coach sales and operations company that provides coach sales, leasing, maintenance, and custom conversion services. Established in 1980, it is a family-owned company located near Nashville, Tennessee, USA.

The company provides coach services to celebrities, such as Cher, Tom Hanks, Pope Benedict XVI, Beyoncé and Jennifer Lopez. The company provided high-security motor coaches to the Obama administration for the 2012 presidential election campaign.

Overview
The company is owned by brothers Joel W. Hemphill, Jr. and Trent Hemphill. They started the company in October 1980, with the assistance of their father, Joel W. Hemphill, Sr., who had retired from the coach leasing business. The company operates a coach maintenance and conversion facility, and it maintains a fleet of over 110 motor coaches for lease. The company deals in used coaches and new custom conversions, and maintains a separate website for its sales operation. On its website, the company claims an extensive list of celebrity clients, including Cher, Lady Gaga, Aerosmith, George Strait, Tom Hanks, Arnold Schwarzenegger, Marilyn Manson, Korn and Pope Benedict XVI.

Maintenance and conversion facility
The company operates three conversion and maintenance facilities totaling more than 48,000 square feet located outside of Nashville. It features a 12-bay maintenance shop and two 6-bay conversion shops, and is used to provide services for the Hemphill lease fleet as well as for select external customers. The operation also maintains a parts department that provides mechanical and conversion coach parts. As part of its customizing operation, the facility maintains woodfinishing and upholstery shops. The conversion operation provides a full range of customizing services to client specifications. For new custom conversions, the operation uses bare coaches from Prevost Car, a manufacturer of touring coach shells for specialty conversions which is located in Quebec, Canada. The operation is a Prevost-authorized maintenance facility.

Buses for 2012 Obama campaign

Hemphill Brothers Coach Company customized the buses that was used by President Barack Obama for a trip to Minnesota, Iowa, and Illinois during the week of August 15, 2011. Although the trip had the appearance of a presidential campaign event, it was designated an official trip by the Obama administration and was thus federally financed. 

Two such buses were ordered by the United States Secret Service in 2010 at a combined cost of $2,191,960. The buses were purchased to address security inadequacies encountered on previous such events where leased vehicles were used. The Secret Service intends to use the buses as a general asset, and they are not specifically dedicated to the President.  As such, the second bus was used in a similar fashion by the Secret Service during the 2012 presidential campaign to transport Mitt Romney.  This second bus is now held by the Secret Service as a backup vehicle.

The Secret Service will not confirm details about the construction and appointment of the buses, but it is likely that they are extensively equipped with security and communication equipment. They are speculated to be similar to other presidential conveyances, such as The Beast. If so, they are heavily armored, pressurized, and built to withstand a chemical or rocket-propelled grenade attack.

The buses are reported to have lavish interiors similar to those provided to entertainment celebrities. They are similar in size to standard Greyhound buses, with black exteriors, blacked-out windows, and police lights.

During the August, 2011 campaign event, the bus provoked considerable interest and commentary in the news and blogosphere. The LA Times reported a comparison of the bus to Darth Vader's helmet. Tea Party activist and CNN commentator Dana Loesch called the bus "a big, black, hearsemobile of doom."

References

Bus companies of the United States
Companies based in Nashville, Tennessee